The VTB United League Final Four MVP is an annual award that is given to the best player of the final four of the VTB United League competition. The award has been given out since the league began. Previously, the award was also known as the VTB United League Playoffs MVP.

Winners
From 2008 until 2012, and since 2018, the league ends with a final four style format. In a weekend, single-elimination games are played in the semi-finals, finals and third place game. The player who played the best during the tournament receives the award.

From 2012 until 2017, the league champions were decided through a playoff format. The Playoffs MVP was awarded to the best player within these playoff series.

Notes

 J.R. Holden, born in Pittsburgh, Pennsylvania, also owns American nationality. He represented Russia in international competitions.
 There was no awarding in the 2019–20, because the season was cancelled due to the coronavirus pandemic in Europe.
 Daniel Hackett also owns American nationality. He represented Italy in international competitions.

References

External links
 VTB United League Official Website 
 VTB United League Official Website 

VTB United League awards